Nadzieja  is a village in the Gmina Wierzbno, Węgrów County, Masovian Voivodeship, Poland.

References

Nadzieja